The Grêmio Recreativo Escola de Samba Unidos da Tijuca is a samba school of the city of  Rio de Janeiro. It was founded on 31 December 1931 from the fusion of existing blocks in Morro do Borel. Among its founders are Leandro Chagas, João de Almeida, Pacific Vasconcelos, Tatão, Alfredo Gomes, Marina Silva, Orlando da Costa Godinho, Zeneida Oliveira, and Regina Vasconcelos.

Classifications

References 

Samba schools of Rio de Janeiro